Kim Anne Kastens (born 1954) is an American geophysicist who is a professor at the Lamont–Doherty Earth Observatory. She was awarded the American Geophysical Union Excellence in Earth and Space Science Education Award in 2009 and elected Fellow in 2021.

Early life and education 
Kastens was born in Menlo Park, California. She was an undergraduate student at Yale University, where she majored in geology and geophysics. After earning her bachelor's diploma in 1975, Kastens moved to the Scripps Institution of Oceanography, where she completed her doctoral research.

Research and career 
Kastens joined the faculty at the Lamont–Doherty Earth Observatory in 1992, and was made Research Professor in 2010. Her work considered marine geology, with a focus on the tectonic and geological evolution of the Mediterranean Sea. She made use of deep sea drilling to understand the growth of the Tyrrhenian Sea, and seafloor mapping to understand deformation across the Mediterranean Ridge.

At Columbia University, Kastens contributed to the development of geoscience education. She worked with the Columbia University Graduate School of Journalism to create an Earth and environmental science program that aligns with the Observatory's public engagement.

Awards and honors 
 2009 American Geophysical Union Excellence in Earth and Space Science Education Award
 2021 Elected Fellow of the American Geophysical Union

Selected publications

References 

Living people
Women geophysicists
Yale University alumni
Lamont–Doherty Earth Observatory people
Scripps Institution of Oceanography alumni
Fellows of the American Geophysical Union
1954 births